Valery Nikonorov (born 26 August 1971) is a Russian wrestler. He competed in the men's Greco-Roman 58 kg at the 2000 Summer Olympics.

References

1971 births
Living people
Russian male sport wrestlers
Olympic wrestlers of Russia
Wrestlers at the 2000 Summer Olympics
Martial artists from Moscow